Adenoviral keratoconjunctivitis, also known as epidemic keratoconjunctivitis, is a contagious eye infection, a type of adenovirus disease caused by adenoviruses. It typically presents as a conjunctivitis with a sudden onset of a painful red eye, watery discharge and feeling that something is in the eye. Photophobia develops with blurred vision and lymphadenopathy by the ear nearest the affected eye. It is often associated with a sore throat and stuffy and runny nose, mainly in adults. A type of adenoviral keratoconjunctivitis in very young children can present with a high fever, sore throat, ear infection, vomiting and diarrhea.

It is commonly caused by types 8 and 37 adenoviruses, spread by contaminated eye examination instruments and eye solutions, touching eyes by infected people, from inadequately chlorinated swimming pools, or other contaminated objects. The incubation period is around five to 10 days.

Usually, the condition is better after a week to 10-days without treatment.  Cold compresses and artificial tears may help. Corneal scarring occurs in up to half of cases and the blurred vision may continue for a long time in some people. The virus may remain in the eye for two-three years after recovering.

It is a common cause of a red eye and tends to occur in large numbers of people at the same time. Adults tend to be affected more frequently than children.

Signs and symptoms
It typically presents as a conjunctivitis with a sudden onset of red eye, watery discharge and feeling that something is in the eye. Photophobia develops with blurred vision and lymphadenopathy by the ear nearest the affected eye. It is typically associated with a pharyngitis and rhinitis, mainly in adults. A type of adenoviral keratoconjunctivitis in very young children can present with a high fever, sore throat, ear infection, vomiting and diarrhea.

Diagnosis
The diagnosis of Adenoviral keratoconjunctivitis is done using cell culture (with immunofluorescence staining) and PCR.

Differential diagnosis
It may appear similar to  herpes simplex type I, acanthamoeba, and fungal infection.

Prevention
Adequate infection control measures should be followed as prevention and to reduce epidemic AKC outbreaks.

Treatment
Topical steroids should be avoided because they prolong viral replication, frequently lead to long-lasting dry eye symptoms, and corneal opacities almost always recur after discontinuation of topical steroids. There is currently no effective and clinically applicable topical antiviral agent for the treatment of the acute phase of AKC. Topical cidofovir is the first antiviral agent which has effectively reduced the incidence of corneal opacities, but local toxicity rules out its clinical application. Recently, NMSO3, a sulfated sialyl lipid, has demonstrated a greater antiviral potency against adenovirus in vitro than cidofovir exhibiting minimal cytotoxicity. Topical cyclosporin A (CsA) appears to be effective in the treatment of persistent corneal opacities. Topical interferon might be effective as a prophylaxis of infection. Topical interferon is currently not commercially available due to unsettled patent issues.

Epidemiology
Globally it is the commonest cause of a red eye and tends to occur in large numbers of people at the same time. Adults tend to be affected more frequently than children.

References

Viral diseases
Adenoviridae
Eye diseases